Cheiridopsis caroli-schmidtii is a species in the family Aizoaceae. Like the other members this species is native to semi-arid regions of Namibia and South Africa. This species grows on Granite and quartz outcrops.

Name
The plant is named after Carl Schmidt who was a German nursery owner who operated in Erfurt. The genus name means hand shaped.

Description
The daisy-like flowers illustrated open during the day from early winter to spring. Like many members of the genus the flower illustrated is borne singly and has Chrome-yellow petals which are 3.5 cm in diameter. The clump of tri-angled leaves that makes up the plant has little or no stem. When fully grown they are over 5 cm tall and about 17 cm in diameter. During the summer the plant dries so much that it can be mistaken for dead.

References

caroli-schmidtii
Plants described in 1926
Taxa named by Kurt Dinter
Taxa named by Alwin Berger
Taxa named by N. E. Brown